The 1949–50 season was the twelfth season of competitive association football in the Football League played by Chester, an English club based in Chester, Cheshire.

It was the club's twelfth consecutive season in the Third Division North since its election to the Football League. Alongside competing in the league, the club also participated in the FA Cup and the Welsh Cup.

Football League

Results summary

Results by matchday

Matches

FA Cup

Welsh Cup

Season statistics

References

1949-50
English football clubs 1949–50 season